Penstemon tenuiflorus, commonly known as eastern whiteflower beardtongue, is a species of flowering plant in the plantain family. It is native only to a small area of the Southeastern United States, in the southern Interior Low Plateau and Black Belt of Alabama and Mississippi. Its preferred habitat is limestone glades and woodlands.

References

tenuiflorus
Flora of the Southeastern United States
Flora without expected TNC conservation status